Nothing But The Truth is the second studio album by Australian music group Southern Sons. The album was released in Australia in November 1992 and reached number 26 on the ARIA charts. The album produced by Louis Shelton and released through RCA Records, was re-released in 1993 with the bonus track, "Silent Witnesses". The album produced five singles, and was also released in the Australian iTunes Store as a digital download in 2010.

Track listing
 "Shelter" (J. Jones, P. Buckle) – 5:18
 "Lead Me to Water" (P. Buckle) – 4:32
 "Sometimes" (P. Buckle, P. Bowman, M. Spiro) – 3:54
 "Is It Any Wonder" (P. Buckle) – 4:15
 "Can't Wait Any Longer" (P. Buckle, J. Jones) – 4:24
 "You Were There" (P. Buckle) – 3:58
 "Nothing But The Truth" (P. Buckle) – 5:11
 "Still Love You So" (P. Buckle) – 4:45
 "Wildest Love" (P. Buckle) – 4:05
 "Can't Breathe" (J. Jones) – 5:17
 "So Unkind" (P. Buckle, J. Jones) – 4:23
 "Silent Witnesses" (1993 reissue bonus track) (P. Buckle) – 4:46
 "You Were There" (Unplugged) (1993 reissue bonus track) (P. Buckle)
 "Lead Me to Water" (Unplugged) (1993 reissue bonus track) (P. Buckle)

Personnel
Jack Jones – lead vocals, guitars
Phil Buckle – guitars, backing vocals
Virgil Donati – drums, keyboards
Geoff Cain – bass
David Hirschfelder – string arrangements and keyboards on "You Were There"
Geoff Hales – additional percussion

Chart positions

References

1992 albums
Southern Sons albums
RCA Records albums